Conrad Cichorius (25 May 1863 in Leipzig – 20 January 1932 in Bonn) was a German historian and classical philologist. He is known for publishing a complete survey of the reliefs of Trajan's Column, which still forms the basis of modern scholarship.

From 1882 to 1886 he studied at the universities of Freiburg, Leipzig and Berlin, and in 1895 became an associate professor at Leipzig. Later on, he was a full professor of ancient history at the universities of Breslau (1900–16) and Bonn (1916–28). In 1923/24 he served as university rector.

Selected works 

 Rom und Mytilene, Teubner, Leipzig 1888
 
 
 Die Reliefs des Denkmals von Adamklissi, Leipzig 1897
 Untersuchungen zu Lucilius, Berlin 1908
 Römische Studien. Historisches, Epigraphisches, Literaturgeschichtliches aus vier Jahrhunderten Roms, Leipzig/Berlin 1922

References

Further reading

External links 

20th-century German historians
Writers from Leipzig
Academic staff of Leipzig University
Academic staff of the University of Breslau
Academic staff of the University of Bonn
1863 births
1932 deaths
German male non-fiction writers
19th-century German historians